Bona may refer to:

Places 
 The former name of Annaba, a city in northeastern Algeria
 Bona (Hum), medieval settlement of the Principality of Hum, located in today's Blagaj, Bosnia and Herzegovina
 Bona (Lena), Burkina Faso
 Bona (Safané), Burkina Faso
 Bona, Nièvre, France
Former civil parish in Scotland now part of the parish of Inverness and Bona
 Bona (Sénégal)
 Bona, Sweden, a town in Östergötland County, Sweden
 Bona, Missouri, U.S.

Other uses
 Bona (singer) (born 1995), member of South Korean girl group WJSN
 Bona (name), given name and surname
 Bona AB, a Swedish flooring company
 Bona (film), a 1980 Philippine film
 Bona Medik. 1787, a synonym of Vicia L.
 Bona, a South African magazine published by Caxton

See also